Mirza Delibašić (9 January 1954 – 8 December 2001) was a Bosnian professional basketball player and coach.

Delibašić was named one of FIBA's 50 Greatest Players in 1991. He was enshrined into the FIBA Hall of Fame in 2007. In 2008, he was named one of the 50 Greatest EuroLeague Contributors. He is widely considered one of the best shooters in the history of European basketball.

Early life
Delibašič was born in  Tuzla, PR Bosnia and Herzegovina to Izet  Delibašić, a  native of Kakanj, and Zajkana (née Mehičević) from Ljubuški. Young Mirza took up tennis, excelling at it. By the age of fourteen, he switched to basketball.

Club career
Mirza Delibašić, nicknamed Kinđe, led his club Bosna to the EuroLeague Championship in 1979. He played his first games at age of 15 for KK Sloboda Dita, Tuzla's basketball club. Three years later, in 1971, he signed a contract with KK Bosna. 

After leaving Bosna, Delibašić went to the Spanish Primera División, where he ended up being considered one of the best players ever to play for Real Madrid, along with the likes of Juan Corbalán, Wayne Brabender, Fernando Martín Espina, Fernando Romay, Dražen Petrović, and Arvydas Sabonis.

In his club career, he won numerous titles in European club competitions. In addition to having played together for their Yugoslav national team, Mirza Delibašić and Dražen Dalipagić, also played together with Real Madrid. Their performance in a 1983 European Champions Cup game versus Cibona, in Zagreb, is only one of the many highlights of their careers. In that game, Delibašić scored 26 points and Dalipagić 33. The game appropriately finished with a two-on-one fast-break, with Delibašić making a behind-the-back fake pass to Dalipagić, and passing by a defender for a two-handed dunk at the buzzer. Cibona's fans put aside their team's loss in the game, and showed their appreciation for the Bosnian stars performances, with a standing ovation at the end of the game.

Career ending
In early summer 1983, twenty-nine-year-old Delibašić left Real Madrid and signed with the Italian League club JuveCaserta coached by his former Bosna mentor Bogdan Tanjević.

In August 1983, the team went for preseason training and conditioning to the town of Bormio in the Italian Alps. Following the gruelling altitude training, after coming back south to Caserta, Delibašić suffered a near-fatal brain hemorrhage that would turn out to be career-ending. With Delibašić in critical condition, a private plane was immediately organized to airlift him to the Military Medical Academy (VMA) in Belgrade where he was hospitalized for months. He survived and recovered, but not enough to return to playing professional basketball thus forcing him to retire from playing basketball effective immediately at only the age of twenty nine.

National team career
En route to a place among the greatest European players, Mirza Delibašić won every major FIBA tournament with the senior Yugoslavian national basketball team, including: the Summer Olympic Games gold medal, at the 1980 Summer Olympics, EuroBasket gold two times (1975 and 1977), and the FIBA World Cup gold at the 1978 FIBA World Championship.

Awards and accomplishments

Professional career
 2× Yugoslav League Champion: (1978, 1980)
 Yugoslav Cup Winner: (1978)
 EuroLeague Champion: (1979)
 FIBA Club World Cup Champion: (1981)
 Spanish League Champion: (1982)
 FIBA's 50 Greatest Players: (1991)
 Bosnia and Herzegovina Sportsman of the 20th century: (2000)
 FIBA Hall of Fame: (2007)
 50 Greatest EuroLeague Contributors: (2008)

Coaching career
Delibašić lived in Sarajevo throughout the 1992-1996 siege of the city. Simultaneously, Delibašić coached the newly established Bosnian national basketball team at EuroBasket 1993 in Germany, where they finished in 8th place.

Personal life and death
In the late 1970s, Delibašić married his girlfriend Branka. Their son Dario was born in December 1979. The couple divorced in 1980, after Delibašić moved abroad to play with Real Madrid.

In 1986, Delibašić, then retired from playing basketball and performing an administrative role at KK Bosna, married Slavica Šuka, an active basketball player with ŽKK Bosna. The same year in October, the couple had a son named Danko.

Due to his heavy drinking and smoking, Delibašić's final years were marked by persistent health problems that led to his death in 2001 in Sarajevo, aged 47. At a funeral attended by thousands, he was interred next to his close friend—singer Davorin Popović who had died earlier that year—at Bare Cemetery's Alley of Greats. After Delibašić's death, KK Bosna renamed its arena in his honor.

See also
 Yugoslav First Federal Basketball League career stats leaders
 Mirza Delibašić Memorial

References

External links
 FIBA Hall of Fame page on Delibasic
 Euroleague.net 50 Greatest Contributors

1954 births
2001 deaths
Alcohol-related deaths in Bosnia and Herzegovina
Basketball players at the 1976 Summer Olympics
Basketball players at the 1980 Summer Olympics
Bosnia and Herzegovina basketball coaches
Bosnia and Herzegovina expatriate basketball people in Spain
Bosnia and Herzegovina men's basketball players
Bosniaks of Bosnia and Herzegovina
Burials at Bare Cemetery, Sarajevo
Competitors at the 1975 Mediterranean Games
Competitors at the 1979 Mediterranean Games
European champions for Yugoslavia
FIBA EuroBasket-winning players
FIBA Hall of Fame inductees
FIBA World Championship-winning players
KK Bosna Royal coaches
KK Bosna Royal players
KK Sloboda Tuzla players
Liga ACB players
Medalists at the 1976 Summer Olympics
Medalists at the 1980 Summer Olympics
Mediterranean Games gold medalists for Yugoslavia
Mediterranean Games medalists in basketball
Olympic basketball players of Yugoslavia
Olympic gold medalists for Yugoslavia
Olympic medalists in basketball
Olympic silver medalists for Yugoslavia
Real Madrid Baloncesto players
Shooting guards
Small forwards
Sportspeople from Tuzla
Bosnia and Herzegovina Muslims
Yugoslav expatriates in Spain
Yugoslav men's basketball players
1978 FIBA World Championship players
1982 FIBA World Championship players